Richard Kenneth Oliver (born 14 November 1989) is an English cricketer who played for Worcestershire. He is a left-handed batsman who also bowls right-arm medium pace. He made his debut for the county on 16 May 2014 in the 2014 NatWest t20 Blast against Durham.

He declined a new contract with Worcestershire in 2015. After a second spell with minor county Shropshire, he became captain of the Reigate Priory club in Surrey.

References

External links
 

1989 births
English cricketers
Shropshire cricketers
Worcestershire cricketers
Living people
English cricketers of the 21st century
Cricketers from Stoke-on-Trent